Simitli Point (‘Nos Simitli’ \'nos 'si-mit-li\) is a point on the north coast of Rugged Island off the west coast of Byers Peninsula of Livingston Island in the South Shetland Islands, Antarctica forming the east side of the entrance to Timok Cove.  Situated 400 m west-southwest of Ivan Vladislav Point, and 2.91 km east-southeast of Cape Sheffield, and 3.61 km south-southwest of Start Point, Livingston Island.

The point is named after the town of Simitli in southwestern Bulgaria.

Location
British mapping in 1968, Spanish in 1992 and Bulgarian in 2009.

Maps
 Península Byers, Isla Livingston. Mapa topográfico a escala 1:25000. Madrid: Servicio Geográfico del Ejército, 1992.
 L.L. Ivanov. Antarctica: Livingston Island and Greenwich, Robert, Snow and Smith Islands. Scale 1:120000 topographic map.  Troyan: Manfred Wörner Foundation, 2009.

References
 Simitli Point. SCAR Composite Gazetteer of Antarctica.
 Bulgarian Antarctic Gazetteer. Antarctic Place-names Commission. (details in Bulgarian, basic data in English)

External links
 Simitli Point. Copernix satellite image

Headlands of the South Shetland Islands
Bulgaria and the Antarctic